Tapputi, also referred to as Tapputi-Belatekallim ("Belatekallim" refers to female overseer of a palace), is considered to be the world’s first recorded chemist, a perfume-maker mentioned in a cuneiform tablet dated around 1200 BC in Babylonian Mesopotamia.  She used flowers, oil, and calamus along with cyperus, myrrh, and balsam. She added water or other solvents then distilled and filtered several times. This is also the oldest referenced still.

She also was an overseer at the Royal Palace, and worked with a researcher named (—)-ninu (the first part of her name has been lost).

In popular culture
 Taputti is one of the main characters of Super Science Friends

See also
 Timeline of chemistry
 Timeline of women in science

References

Babylonian women
Women chemists
Perfumers
Iraqi women scientists
Ancient women scientists
11th-century BC women
11th-century BC people
Courtiers